Casey Dellacqua was the defending champion having won the previous edition in 2011, however she had retired from professional tennis in April 2018.

Kimberly Birrell won the title, defeating Ellen Perez in an all-Australian final, 6–3, 6–3.

Seeds

Draw

Finals

Top half

Bottom half

References
Main Draw

Darwin Tennis International - Singles